Dean E. Chynoweth (born October 30, 1968) is a Canadian former professional ice hockey defenceman who played in the National Hockey League for the New York Islanders and the Boston Bruins. Drafted 13th overall by the Islanders in the 1987 NHL Entry Draft, Chynoweth played 241 regular season games in 10 NHL seasons, scoring 4 goals and 18 assists for 22 points and clocked up 667 penalty minutes.  He was also the head coach of the WHL's Seattle Thunderbirds. He served as the general manager and head coach for another WHL franchise, the Swift Current Broncos, from 2004 to 2011. Chynoweth was formerly an assistant coach with the New York Islanders.

Chynoweth is also the son of Ed Chynoweth, a respected former hockey executive who was on the selection committee of the Hockey Hall of Fame and was the longtime president of the WHL.  Ed Chynoweth died on April 22, 2008 of cancer aged 66. Chynoweth is an ancient Cornish name.

On June 26, 2012, Chynoweth was named head coach of the American Hockey League's Lake Erie Monsters.

On July 17, 2018, Chynoweth was hired as an assistant coach for the NHL's Carolina Hurricanes

On July 12, 2021, Chynoweth was hired as an assistant coach for the NHL's Toronto Maple Leafs

Career statistics

References

External links

1968 births
Living people
Boston Bruins players
Canadian ice hockey defencemen
Canadian people of Cornish descent
Capital District Islanders players
Carolina Hurricanes coaches
Medicine Hat Tigers players
National Hockey League first-round draft picks
New York Islanders coaches
New York Islanders draft picks
New York Islanders players
Providence Bruins players
Quebec Rafales players
Salt Lake Golden Eagles (IHL) players
Seattle Thunderbirds coaches
Ice hockey people from Calgary
Springfield Indians players
Swift Current Broncos coaches
Toronto Maple Leafs coaches
Canadian expatriate ice hockey players in the United States